Lionel Barrymore (born Lionel Herbert Blythe; 1878–1954) was an American actor of stage, screen, and radio. He also directed several films, wrote scripts, created etchings, sketches, and composed music. He was the eldest child of the actors Maurice Barrymore and Georgie Drew Barrymore, and his two siblings were John and Ethel; these and other family members were part of an acting dynasty. Reluctant to follow his parents' career, Barrymore appeared together with his grandmother Louisa Lane Drew in a stage production of The Rivals at the age of 15. He soon found success on stage in character roles. Although he took a break from acting in 1906–1909 to train in Paris as a painter, he was not successful as an artist, and returned to the US and acting. He also joined his family troupe, from 1910, in their vaudeville act.

Barrymore began his film career in 1911, appearing in numerous silent films, many of which have subsequently been lost. In 1911, he signed a contract with the Biograph Company and appeared as a character actor in short films, many of them directed by D. W. Griffith, before moving into feature-length productions in 1914. He began writing scripts and directing films shortly afterwards, and for the next five years, he did not act on the legitimate stage. Although he had several successes on Broadway after the First World War, he encountered strongly negative criticism in a 1921 production of Macbeth, and in three productions in a row in 1925. Afterwards, he never again appeared on the New York stage. In 1925, he signed a contract with Metro-Goldwyn-Mayer, where he became a close friend of Louis B. Mayer, for whom he made numerous films. He directed several films from 1929 to 1931, but concentrated on acting afterwards.

Barrymore became well known in curmudgeonly roles. In 1938, he broke his hip, and, aggravated by arthritis, he lived the remainder of his life in a wheelchair. Mayer made sure that roles were found or written to accommodate Barrymore, who continued to act in films until 1953. During that time, he appeared as Dr. Gillespie in the popular Dr. Kildare film series, with Lew Ayres in the titular role, and as Mr. Potter in It's a Wonderful Life—a role that was highly placed on the American Film Institute's list of the 100 Heroes and Villains in a film that the critic Philip French described as "a complex inspirational work". Beginning in the 1930s, Barrymore increasingly worked in radio, initially as Ebenezer Scrooge in Charles Dickens's A Christmas Carol, which was broadcast annually from 1934 to 1953, then in Mayor of the Town, beginning in 1942, and also in a radio series spun off from the Dr. Kildare films (playing the same character that he had played in the films), among others.

Two of the films in which Barrymore appeared—Grand Hotel (1932), and You Can't Take It with You (1938)—won the Academy Award for Best Picture. He was considered for the Academy Award for Best Director for his 1929 film, Madame X, and won the Best Actor award for his performance in A Free Soul (1931). He was inducted to the Hollywood Walk of Fame on February 8, 1960, and is, along with his two siblings, included in the American Theater Hall of Fame.

Stage appearances

Filmography

As actor

The list does not include the 1913 film The Vengeance of Galora, which Barrymore wrote. Although some sources list him as also appearing in the film, his biographers, James Kotsilibas-Davis and Margot Peters, separately state he did not. Kotsilibas-Davis also lists Fighting Blood (1911), My Hero (1912), and The Musketeers of Pig Alley (1912) as films in which Barrymore did not appear, despite claims of other biographers to the contrary; Peters does not list the films in her filmography of the actor.

As director

Radio broadcasts

Television broadcast

Notes and references

Notes

References

Sources

External links

 
 
 
 Lionel Barrymore in 1910(archived)

Barrymore
Director filmographies
American filmographies